Rowswell is a surname. Notable people with the surname include:

Brad Rowswell (born 1986), Australian politician
Garth Rowswell, Canadian politician
John Rowswell (1955–2010), Canadian politician 
Rosey Rowswell (1884–1955), American radio sportscaster

See also
Roswell (disambiguation)